is an anime television series created by Yoshiyuki Tomino and produced by Sotsu and Sunrise.

Dunbine is set in Byston Well, a parallel world that resembles the countryside of medieval Europe with kingdoms ruled by monarchs in castles, armies of unicorn-riding cavalry armed with swords and crossbows, and little winged creatures called Ferario, flying about offering help or hindrance depending on their mood. The main draw to the series were the insect-like Aura Battlers, used by the population of Byston Well to fight their wars. These fighting suits are powered by a powerful energy called "aura" or "life energy." Certain people are strong enough with the aura-energy to act as power-supply to these mecha, making them Aura Warriors.

The series aired on Nagoya TV from February 5, 1983, to January 21, 1984, totaling for 49 episodes. There was a three-episode anime OVA sequel, New Story of Aura Battler Dunbine (also known as The Tale of Neo Byston Well) released in 1988.

The series was later dubbed by ADV Films and was released to DVD in North America, along with the original Japanese version in 2003. However, it quickly went out of print, and until 2018, was only available as a digital purchase from the now-defunct Daisuki site, then Sentai Filmworks licensed the series.

Plot
The series followed Shō Zama, as he suddenly finds himself pulled to the world of Byston Well during a vehicular incident with one of his rivals. Byston Well is located in another dimension located between the sea and the land, and is populated with dragons, castles, knights, and powerful robots known as Aura Battlers. Once Shō is discovered to possess a very powerful "aura", he is drafted into the Byston Well conflict as the pilot of the lavender-colored Dunbine.

As in other Tomino creations, Dunbine's cast is populated by Nordic-looking military types in elaborate costumes on one side, a young Japanese hero caught in the middle, and freedom fighters on the other side. Beautiful female warriors abound on both sides, and the hero falls for the main female lead. There are romances that cut across battle lines, and the non-stop battles between elaborate fighting craft on land and on the air. Most of the cast pilot Aura Battlers, although there are many standard airships, smaller fighters, and large warships as well. Also, in typical Tomino style, a large number of named characters die tragically throughout the series.

Characters

Shō is the young protagonist of the series. Before coming to Byston Well, he lived in Tokyo and enjoyed motocross racing. One night, as he was riding his motorcycle through the city, he was yanked to Byston Well in order to serve as a mecha pilot under the command of regional overlord Drake Luft. He soon discovers Luft's evil motives and switches sides, joining Nie Givun and his freedom fighters in their resistance to Luft's military advances. Over time (and through experience in battle,) Shō's Aura Power increases to near infinite levels, while control over his power correspondingly weakens. Also, during the series, he returns to Earth twice, but his already strained and dysfunctional relationship with his estranged parents (one of whom may be American) crumbles completely when they refuse to believe that he is not an impostor (he was believed dead during the 'accident' where he and his motorcycle disappeared—drawn to Byston Well). To further complicate matters, he comes to harbor intimate feelings for Marvel. However, the stresses of war prevent them from actively pursuing their relationship.

An attractive young woman whose wealthy parents own a large ranch near Dallas, Texas, Marvel was also brought to Byston Well to fight on the side of Drake Luft, but now works with Nie Givun to overthrow Luft. She and Shō Zama first meet as enemies, but, between her getting him to question his allegiance, and his guilt when House Luft attacks House Givun and kills Nie's mother, he soon allies with her. Her fighting abilities are on par with Shō, but she lags far behind him in Aura Power. When the battling armies of Byston Well are sent to Upper Earth by the Ferario, Marvel takes time to reconcile with her parents, and also to spend a few days visiting Hawaii with Shō. Though, early on, she seems to have some interest in Nie, Marvel falls deeply in love with Shō, and wishes that he would admit the feelings she knows he has for her.

A faerie companion of Shō's, and shown in the final episode to be the only survivor of the final battle. Cham provides the emotional barometer to the group, and often finds herself more sensitive to the tensions in a situation. She is Shō's cheerleader, and vigorously defends him from enemies and naysayers alike.

A somewhat embittered freedom fighter, Nie leads a small faction that opposes the military objectives of Drake Luft. Both of his parents are killed early in the war by Drake's forces, leaving him the sole survivor of the Givun family name. He commands the Aura ship, Zelana, and is harsh but dedicated to his crew. He also finds himself faced with a conflict during the war as he carries on a romance with Rimul Luft, Drake's daughter.

The daughter of a noble house, Keen spends much of the earlier part of the series trying to prove herself. Her father, choosing to serve Drake to uphold the family name, is killed in combat against Nie's forces (Keen herself has to fight him.) Keen is a loyal, if not exactly skilled fighter, and is able to hold her own well enough until the final battle, even if she sometimes lets her want to prove herself get the better of her. While versed in the use of Aura Battlers, more often than not Keen serves as a support pilot, sortieing in the Fou fighter unit. She has feelings for Nie, but he does not seem to notice them.

Daughter of Drake Luft. While she does not seem to hate her father as a person, she shares no love for his actions and makes several efforts to aid Nie Givun's resistance forces. While her father does care about her, and, to that end, wishes to engage her to Burne, he fails to notice she is in love with Nie. She tries to escape her father to aid the resistance multiple times, but is repeatedly recaptured. Eventually, she escapes and joins Nie's group. Here, however, she's met with distrust by many, even after she proves herself in battle. A decent pilot, she does not get many chances to actively fight before she's taken back into custody. While she still seems to care for her father, she has no love for her mother, Luza. Unlike her father, she can see through her mother's schemes.

Brought to Byston Well along with Shō, Todd means well enough but has the misfortune of making many poor decisions. Unlike Shō, who knows what he wants to fight for, Todd finds his motives changing throughout his time in the war. Initially believing Byston Well to be only a dream, he takes a very lax attitude to his new role, enticed by the prospect he could very well become a king in Byston Well. It is only after several defeats, and being faced with the prospect of being replaced by Drake, that he starts to become serious, now fighting for his pride. During one of these battles, he is taken down by Shō and left bed-ridden for some time. When he returns and finds he's been cast aside by Drake, he eagerly accepts an offer from one of Drake's compatriots, Bishot, as he sees an opportunity to get revenge on Shō for his disgrace. It is only when the armies are sent to Upper Earth that he finally finds a cause worth fighting for, believing if he can defeat Shō, Drake will not attack America, and thus he can protect his mother.

Shō Zama's former commander. Throughout most of the series, he serves Shō's main rival. Commands extreme respect from his underlings, and grudging respect from his superiors. Burne oversees Drake's armies for a better part of the war. During the latter half of the series, however, he is defeated by Shō and left for dead. He then returns to Drake's army under the moniker of Black Knight. He is, for a time, engaged to Rimul, even though she does not hold mutual feelings for him.

The queen of the land of Na. She is rescued by Shō and encourages him to fight for not only the crew of the Zelana, but for all people of Byston Well. Later she rallies her army (including the powerful battleship Gran-Garan) and joins Shō's group in the fight against Luft. When the Dunbine is defeated in battle, it is her forces that provide Shō with the powerful new Billbine battler.

The main antagonist of the series, Drake is the lord who initially orders Shō (and others) drawn into Byston Well. An ambitious man, Drake believes he is doing the right thing by forcefully uniting the people of Byston Well under his banner. His personal life is not much better, as, while he holds love for his daughter, Rimul, he fails to realize that she's been working against him. Similarly, he also remains oblivious to his wife's plotting behind his back with Bishot to have him eliminated. During the final battle, he commands the battleship Will-Wips.

A brilliant, but shady man. Shott is responsible for inventing the Aura Battlers. Originally believed to be from Silicon Valley, the later episodes of the anime suggest there's more to his past than he's willing to let on. Nevertheless, along with being a skilled inventor, he proves a fierce opponent as he brings his own contributions into the final battle, including the battleship Spriggan.

One of Drake's comrades and, as far as Drake believes, an ally, Bishot is actually quite the opposite. Throughout much of the series, he and Luza are actually plotting behind Drake's back, presumably planning to seize power from him. He also provides a great deal of the force involved in the final battle, and he's the one who enlists Todd after he's dismissed by Drake. During the final battle, he commands the warship Gyre-Garing.

Granddaughter of King Phaezon and the third major contributor to the resistance during the final battles. Commanding the armies of her grandfather and the immensely powerful warship Graon, Elle fights for those in her family who have lost their lives to the war. As the series progresses, she also begins to develop tremendous aura powers, even having the ability to influence pilots from a distance.

After the failure of the trio from Upper Earth that included Shō and Todd, Drake has a second set brought over for his armies. Jeryll is easily the deadliest of these three. Violent, impulsive, and seemingly enjoying the carnage, her immense powers serve as a frightening mirror to what Shō could have become had he continued serving with Drake. She is also the first pilot to bring about 'hyper' mode (when a pilot experiences a great surge of aura power causing their battler to grow several times larger and become devastating as a result.)

Burne's follower, wants to fly an Aura Battler.

Songs
Opening theme  performed by MIQ
Ending theme  performed by MIO
Insert songs
 performed by Hiromi Koide
 performed by Hiromi Koide

Appearances in other media

Super Robot Wars
The Dunbine characters, mecha, and storyline elements make appearances in quite a few games in the Super Robot Wars series by Banpresto; most notably the "first" series. Banpresto has gone on to make spinoff series taking place in different universes such as the Alpha series and Impact. However, Dunbine has made few appearances in these latter titles, but has recently been making something of a comeback, first returning in UX, followed almost immediately after by Operation Extend and BX. T gives the most recent use of the story.

Another Century's Episode
The Dunbine units have also appeared in the Another Century's Episode series. In the first sequel, Another Century's Episode 2, many more units from the Dunbine series are included compared to the amount in the first game, and they have a very large part in the plot. Shō and Marvel, piloting the Bilbine and Dunbine respectively, also acquire a unique team attack. In Another Century's Episode 3, through the story plot did not involve Dunbine's. But all the player unit continues appear, and Bilbine shares a combination attack with Nanajin from The Wings of Rean, which also having its world set up in Byston Well.

Video games
The first three games were produced by Family Soft for the MSX. The 2000 title was released for the PlayStation by Bandai.
Seisenshi Dunbine (1991)
Seisenshi Dunbine: Shou (1992)
Seisenshi Dunbine: Shita (1992)
Aura Battler Dunbine (2000)

New Story of Aura Battler Dunbine

New Story of Aura Battler Dunbine (also known as The Tale of Neo Byston Well), is a three episode anime OVA released in 1988. It is a sequel to the TV Series Dunbine set roughly 700 years after the events of the show. It is also the second show set in the fictional medieval land of Byston Well, and is followed by Garzey's Wing and The Wings of Rean.

It was directed by Toshifumi Takizawa (Samurai 7).

Plot
700 years have passed since the great war involving Aura Machines ended. In his attempt to conquer Byston Well, the Black Knight Rabaan kidnaps the princess of the nation Baran-Baran – a nation said to hold a legendary treasure. Rabaan also captures Shion, a young hunter.

Shion and the princess, Remul, escape from Rabaan's castle and return to their homeland. There, they find out that the Baran-Baran treasure is actually a powerful Aura Battler, Sirbine.

Riding the Sirbine, Shion fights against Rabaan's evil forces.

Characters

Voiced by Shigeru Nakahara
The protagonist of the story, Shion is a young man from Baran-Baran. After being captured by Rabaan, he and Remul escape with the help of a fairy, Silky Mau. He pilots the Sirbine, a powerful Aura Battler, against Rabaan's forces. He is actually the reincarnation of Shō Zama from the original TV series.

Voiced by Yoshino Takamori
Princess of Baran-Baran, Remul's family were tasked with the job of guarding the Sirbine. She is the reincarnation of Rimul Luft.
 

Voiced by Keiko Yokozawa
Silky is a Ferario (faerie) which was captured by Shion at the beginning of the series, but decides to help him after he releases her. Silky was the Ferario captured and used by Drake Luft in the original Dunbine to draw aura warriors from Upper Earth.
 

Voiced by Shō Hayami
The self-proclaimed "Black Knight", Rabaan rides the Aura Battler "Zwauth". He leads an army to conquest Byston Well. He is the reincarnation of Burne Bannings.

Voiced by Shinobu Adachi
A female warrior, she is a subordinate of Rabaan's. She's the reincarnation of Garalia Nyamhee.

Voiced by Masahiko Tanaka
A mysterious being who seems to have an ulterior motive. The only "survivor" in Byston Well from the original Dunbine series.

Music
"Last No"
Performed by Midori Karashima. Used as ending theme for the 1st episode.

Performed by Midori Karashima. Used as ending theme for second and third episodes.

Staff
Original Creation - Yoshiyuki Tomino
Director - Toshifumi Takizawa
Writer - Yoshitake Suzuki
Character Designer - Tomonori Kogawa
Mecha Designer - Yutaka Izubuchi
Animation Director - Moriyasu Tanikuchi
Art Director - Eiji Hirakawa
Sound Director - Sadayoshi Fujino
Composer - Reijiro Koroku

References

External links
 Aura Battler Dunbine Web 
 
 

1983 anime television series debuts
1988 anime OVAs
ADV Films
Adventure anime and manga
Bandai games
Bandai Namco franchises
Family Soft games
Isekai anime and manga
Japan-exclusive video games
Mecha anime and manga
MSX games
MSX-only games
PlayStation (console) games
PlayStation (console)-only games
Sentai Filmworks
Sunrise (company)
Video games based on anime and manga
Video games developed in Japan